Châteauesque (or Francis I style, or in Canada, the Château Style) is a Revivalist architectural style based on the French Renaissance architecture of the monumental châteaux of the Loire Valley from the late fifteenth century to the early seventeenth century.

The term châteauesque (literally, "château-like") is credited (by historian Marcus Whiffen) to American architectural historian Bainbridge Bunting, although it can be found in publications that pre-date Bunting's birth. As of 2011, the Getty Research Institute's Art & Architecture Thesaurus includes both "Château Style" and "Châteauesque", with the former being the preferred term for North America.

The style frequently features buildings heavily ornamented by the elaborate towers, spires, and steeply-pitched roofs of sixteenth century châteaux, themselves influenced by late Gothic and Italian Renaissance architecture. Despite their French ornamentation, as a revival style, buildings in the châteauesque style do not attempt to completely emulate a French château. Châteauesque buildings are typically built on an asymmetrical plan, with a roof-line broken in several places and a facade composed of advancing and receding planes.

History
The style was popularized in the United States by Richard Morris Hunt. Hunt, the first American architect to study at the École des Beaux-Arts in Paris, designed residences, including those for the Vanderbilt family, during the 1870s, 1880s and 1890s. A relatively rare style in the United States, its presence was concentrated in the Northeast, although isolated examples can be found in nearly all parts of the country. It was mostly employed for residences of the extremely wealthy, although it was occasionally used for public buildings.

The first building in this style in Canada was the 1887 Quebec City Armoury (now named the Voltigeurs de Québec Armoury, formerly called the Grande-Allée Armoury (French: Manège militaire Grande-Allée, or simply Manège militaire) designed by Eugène-Étienne Taché. Many of Canada's grand railway hotels, designed by John Smith Archibald, Edward Maxwell, Bruce Price and Ross and Macdonald, were built in the Châteauesque style, with other mainly public or residential buildings. The style may be associated with Canadian architecture because these grand hotels are prominent landmarks in major cities across the country and in certain national parks.

In Hungary, Arthur Meinig built numerous country houses in the Loire Valley style, the earliest being Andrássy Castle in Tiszadob, 1885–1890, and the grandest being Károlyi Castle in Nagykároly (Carei), 1893–1895.

The style began to fade after the turn of the 20th century, and it was largely absent from new construction by the 1930s.

Architects who designed in Châteauesque style
 John Smith Archibald of Archibald and Schofield
 Bradford Gilbert
 Bruce Price
 Edward Maxwell
 Eugène-Étienne Taché
 Francis Rattenbury
 Sproatt and Rolph
 Hippolyte Destailleur
 Richard Morris Hunt
 Ross and Macfarlane, Ross and Macdonald
 Solon Spencer Beman
 Walter-André Destailleur
 Will Price
 William Henry Crossland

Examples in Europe

United Kingdom

Examples in the United States

Examples in Canada

Many of the Châteauesque-style buildings in Canada were built by railway companies, and their respective hotel divisions. They include Canadian National Railway and Canadian National Hotels, Canadian Pacific Railway and Canadian Pacific Hotels, and the Grand Trunk Railway.

See also

List of architectural styles
Empire style
French architecture
Revivalism (architecture)

References

External links

Yorklinks.net: Images of Châteauesque architecture
Ci.chi.il.us: Châteauesque style guide — images from Chicago architecture.
Oldlouisville.com: Châteauesque homes in Louisville — images from Louisville, Kentucky.

 01

Architectural styles
American architectural styles
Revival architectural styles
19th-century architectural styles
20th-century architectural styles